Evert Hoving (born 14 January 1953) is a retired Dutch middle-distance runner. He competed at the 1976 Summer Olympics in the 800 m and 1500 m events, but failed to reach the finals.

References

External links
Evert Hoving. all-athletics.com

1953 births
Living people
Athletes (track and field) at the 1976 Summer Olympics
Dutch male middle-distance runners
Olympic athletes of the Netherlands
People from Steenwijkerland
20th-century Dutch people
21st-century Dutch people
Sportspeople from Overijssel